The Faith (Spanish:La fe) is a 1947 Spanish drama film directed by Rafael Gil and starring Amparo Rivelles, Rafael Durán and Guillermo Marín.

The film's art direction was by Enrique Alarcón.

Cast

 Amparo Rivelles as Marta Osuna  
 Rafael Durán  as Padre Luis Lastra 
 Guillermo Marín as Don Álvaro Montesinos  
 Juan Espantaleón as Padre Miguel Vigil Suárez  
 Ricardo Calvo as Obispo  
 Fernando Fernández de Córdoba as Sr. Osuna 
 Camino Garrigó as Josefa  
 José Prada as Don Martín  
 Joaquín Roa as Sacerdote acompañante del P. Miguel  
 Félix Fernández as Pelegrín  
 Ángel de Andrés as Dueño casa huéspedes 
 Carmen Sánchez as Doña Eloísa  
 Irene Caba Alba as Dueña casa huéspedes  
 Juan Vázquez as Don Gaspar  
 Arturo Marín as Ramiro  
 Manuel Guitián as Juan  
 Julia Lajos as Teodora  
 Fernando Aguirre as Maestro  
 Cándida Losada as Joaquina 
 Ángel Martinez
 Luisa Sala

References

Bibliography 
 Bentley, Bernard. A Companion to Spanish Cinema. Boydell & Brewer 2008.

External links 
 

1947 drama films
Spanish drama films
1947 films
1940s Spanish-language films
Films directed by Rafael Gil
Suevia Films films
Spanish black-and-white films
1940s Spanish films